This is a list of public endorsements for declared candidates for the July–September 2022 leadership election for the Conservative Party of the United Kingdom.

Members of Parliament

Kemi Badenoch 

Adam Afriyie, MP for Windsor
Lucy Allan, MP for Telford (subsequently endorsed Truss)
Lee Anderson, MP for Ashfield (subsequently endorsed Truss)
Gareth Bacon, MP for Orpington (subsequently endorsed Truss)
Ben Bradley, MP for Mansfield
Alex Burghart, MP for Brentwood and Ongar (subsequently endorsed Truss)
Robert Courts, MP for Witney (previously endorsed Shapps)
Sarah Dines, MP for Derbyshire Dales (subsequently endorsed Truss)
Leo Docherty, MP for Aldershot (subsequently endorsed Truss)
Steve Double, MP for St Austell and Newquay (subsequently endorsed Sunak)
Nick Fletcher, MP for Don Valley (subsequently endorsed Truss)
Michael Gove, MP for Surrey Heath (subsequently endorsed Sunak)
John Hayes, MP for South Holland and the Deepings (subsequently endorsed Truss)
Eddie Hughes, MP for Walsall North
Tom Hunt, MP for Ipswich (subsequently endorsed Truss)
Caroline Johnson, MP for Sleaford and North Hykeham (subsequently endorsed Truss)
Pauline Latham, MP for Mid Derbyshire (subsequently endorsed Truss)
Andrew Lewer, MP for Northampton South (subsequently endorsed Truss)
Marco Longhi, MP for Dudley North (subsequently endorsed Truss)
Julia Lopez, MP for Hornchurch and Upminster (subsequently endorsed Truss)
Craig Mackinlay, MP for South Thanet
Rachel Maclean, MP for Redditch (subsequently endorsed Truss)
Nigel Mills, MP for Amber Valley (subsequently endorsed Truss)
Neil O'Brien, MP for Harborough
Tom Randall, MP for Gedling (subsequently endorsed Sunak)
Lee Rowley, MP for North East Derbyshire (subsequently endorsed Truss)
Desmond Swayne, MP for New Forest West (subsequently endorsed Sunak)
Justin Tomlinson, MP for North Swindon 
Bill Wiggin, MP for North Herefordshire  (subsequently endorsed Truss)

Suella Braverman 

Steve Baker, MP for Wycombe (subsequently endorsed Truss)
Scott Benton, MP for Blackpool South (subsequently endorsed Truss)
Miriam Cates, MP for Penistone and Stocksbridge
Richard Drax, MP for South Dorset (subsequently endorsed Truss)
John Hayes, MP for South Holland and the Deepings (subsequently endorsed Badenoch and Truss)
Philip Hollobone, MP for Kettering
Bernard Jenkin, MP for Harwich and North Essex
David Jones, MP for Clwyd West (subsequently endorsed Truss)
Danny Kruger, MP for Devizes (subsequently endorsed Truss)
Julian Lewis, MP for New Forest East (subsequently endorsed Truss)
Jason McCartney, MP for Colne Valley (subsequently endorsed Truss)
Robin Millar, MP for Aberconwy (subsequently endorsed Truss)
Greg Smith, MP for Buckingham (subsequently endorsed Truss)
Henry Smith, MP for Crawley (subsequently endorsed Truss)
Desmond Swayne, MP for New Forest West (subsequently endorsed Badenoch, then Sunak)

Jeremy Hunt 

Paul Beresford, MP for Mole Valley (subsequently endorsed Sunak)
Crispin Blunt, MP for Reigate (subsequently endorsed Sunak)
Peter Bottomley, MP for Worthing West
Steve Brine, MP for Winchester (subsequently endorsed Sunak)
Philip Davies, MP for Shipley (subsequently endorsed Sunak)
Jonathan Djanogly, MP for Huntingdon (subsequently endorsed Sunak)
Philip Dunne, MP for Ludlow 
Oliver Heald, MP for North East Hertfordshire (subsequently endorsed Truss)
Daniel Kawczynski, MP for Shrewsbury and Atcham (subsequently endorsed Truss)
Anthony Mangnall, MP for Totnes (subsequently endorsed Sunak)
Esther McVey, MP for Tatton
Andrew Mitchell, MP for Sutton Coldfield (subsequently endorsed Sunak)
David Morris, MP for Morecambe and Lunesdale
Dan Poulter, MP for Central Suffolk and North Ipswich (subsequently endorsed Sunak)

Sajid Javid 

Edward Argar, MP for Charnwood (subsequently endorsed Truss)
Saqib Bhatti, MP for Meriden (subsequently endorsed Truss)
Steve Double, MP for St Austell and Newquay (subsequently endorsed Badenoch, then Sunak)
Virginia Crosbie, MP for Ynys Môn (subsequently endorsed Truss)
Robert Halfon, MP for Harlow (subsequently endorsed Sunak)
Pauline Latham, MP for Mid Derbyshire (subsequently endorsed Badenoch and Truss)
Rachel Maclean, MP for Redditch (subsequently endorsed Badenoch, then Truss)
Chris Philp, MP for Croydon South (subsequently endorsed Truss)
Mary Robinson, MP for Cheadle (subsequently endorsed Truss)
Robin Walker, MP for Worcester (subsequently endorsed Sunak)
Mike Wood, MP for Dudley South (subsequently endorsed Sunak)
Jeremy Wright, MP for Kenilworth and Southam (subsequently endorsed Mordaunt and Sunak)

Penny Mordaunt 

Peter Aldous, MP for Waveney (subsequently endorsed Sunak)
Caroline Ansell, MP for Eastbourne (subsequently endorsed Sunak)
Sarah Atherton, MP for Wrexham (subsequently endorsed Truss)
Duncan Baker, MP for North Norfolk (subsequently endorsed Truss)
Harriett Baldwin, MP for West Worcestershire
John Baron, MP for Basildon and Billericay
Jack Brereton, MP for Stoke-on-Trent South (previously endorsed Zahawi)
Theo Clarke, MP for Stafford
Elliot Colburn, MP for Carshalton and Wallington
Damian Collins, MP for Folkestone and Hythe (subsequently endorsed Truss)
Alberto Costa, MP for South Leicestershire (subsequently endorsed Truss)
James Davies, MP for Vale of Clwyd (subsequently endorsed Truss)
Mims Davies, MP for Mid Sussex (subsequently endorsed Truss)
David Davis, MP for Haltemprice and Howden (subsequently endorsed Sunak)
Caroline Dinenage, MP for Gosport
Michelle Donelan, MP for Chippenham (subsequently endorsed Truss)
Tobias Ellwood , MP for Bournemouth East (previously endorsed Zahawi; whip suspended on 19 July)
Natalie Elphicke, MP for Dover (subsequently endorsed Truss)
Luke Evans, MP for Bosworth (subsequently endorsed Sunak)
Michael Fabricant, MP for Lichfield (subsequently endorsed Truss)
George Freeman, MP for Mid Norfolk (subsequently endorsed Sunak)
Roger Gale, MP for North Thanet
James Gray, MP for North Wiltshire (subsequently endorsed Sunak)
Damian Green, MP for Ashford (subsequently endorsed Sunak)
Trudy Harrison, MP for Copeland (subsequently endorsed Truss)
Gordon Henderson, MP for Sittingbourne and Sheppey (subsequently endorsed Truss)
Antony Higginbotham, MP for Burnley (subsequently endorsed Truss)
Alicia Kearns, MP for Rutland and Melton (subsequently endorsed Sunak)
Kate Kniveton, MP for Burton
John Lamont, MP for Berwickshire, Roxburgh and Selkirk (subsequently endorsed Sunak)
Andrea Leadsom, MP for South Northamptonshire (subsequently endorsed Truss)
Ian Levy, MP for Blyth Valley (subsequently endorsed Truss)
Tim Loughton, MP for East Worthing and Shoreham 
Jerome Mayhew, MP for Broadland  (subsequently endorsed Truss)
Stephen Metcalfe, MP for South Basildon and East Thurrock 
Maria Miller, MP for Basingstoke (subsequently endorsed Truss)
Robbie Moore, MP for Keighley
Jill Mortimer, MP for Hartlepool 
Kieran Mullan, MP for Crewe and Nantwich (subsequently endorsed Truss)
Caroline Nokes, MP for Romsey and Southampton North (subsequently endorsed Sunak)
Mike Penning, MP for Hemel Hempstead (subsequently endorsed Truss)
John Penrose, MP for Weston-Super-Mare (subsequently endorsed Truss)
Nicola Richards, MP for West Bromwich East (subsequently endorsed Truss)
Gary Sambrook, MP for Birmingham Northfield
Bob Seely, MP for Isle of Wight (subsequently endorsed Truss)
Bob Stewart, MP for Beckenham (subsequently endorsed Sunak)
James Sunderland, MP for Bracknell (subsequently endorsed Truss)
Derek Thomas, MP for St Ives (subsequently endorsed Truss)
Craig Tracey, MP for North Warwickshire (subsequently endorsed Truss)
Charles Walker, MP for Broxbourne (subsequently endorsed Sunak)
Jamie Wallis, MP for Bridgend (subsequently endorsed Sunak)
Heather Wheeler, MP for South Derbyshire (subsequently endorsed Truss)
Jeremy Wright, MP for Kenilworth and Southam (subsequently endorsed Sunak)

Grant Shapps 

Paul Bristow, MP for Peterborough (subsequently endorsed Truss)
Robert Courts, MP for Witney (subsequently endorsed Badenoch)
James Davies, MP for Vale of Clwyd (subsequently endorsed Mordaunt, then Truss)
George Eustice, MP for Camborne and Redruth (subsequently endorsed Sunak)
Trudy Harrison, MP for Copeland (subsequently endorsed Mordaunt, then Truss)
Sheryll Murray, MP for South East Cornwall (subsequently endorsed Truss)
Mark Pritchard, MP for The Wrekin (subsequently endorsed Truss)
Graham Stuart, MP for Beverley and Holderness (subsequently endorsed Truss)

Rishi Sunak 

Bim Afolami, MP for Hitchin and Harpenden
Nickie Aiken, MP for Cities of London and Westminster (previously endorsed Tugendhat)
Peter Aldous, MP for Waveney (previously endorsed Mordaunt)
Stuart Andrew, MP for Pudsey
Caroline Ansell, MP for Eastbourne (previously endorsed Mordaunt)
Victoria Atkins, MP for Louth and Horncastle
Richard Bacon, MP for South Norfolk
Siobhan Baillie, MP for Stroud
Steve Barclay, MP for North East Cambridgeshire
Simon Baynes, MP for Clwyd South
Paul Beresford, MP for Mole Valley (previously endorsed Hunt)
Crispin Blunt, MP for Reigate (previously endorsed Hunt)
Andrew Bowie, MP for West Aberdeenshire and Kincardine
Andrew Bridgen, MP for North West Leicestershire
Steve Brine, MP for Winchester (previously endorsed Hunt)
Anthony Browne, MP for South Cambridgeshire
Robert Buckland, MP for South Swindon (subsequently endorsed Truss)
Alun Cairns, MP for Vale of Glamorgan (subsequently endorsed Truss)
James Cartlidge, MP for South Suffolk
Maria Caulfield, MP for Lewes
Alex Chalk, MP for Cheltenham
Rehman Chishti, MP for Gillingham and Rainham (previously endorsed Tugendhat)
Chris Clarkson, MP for Heywood and Middleton
Geoffrey Clifton-Brown, MP for Cotswold
Claire Coutinho, MP for East Surrey
Geoffrey Cox, MP for Torridge and West Devon
Stephen Crabb, MP for Preseli Pembrokeshire
Gareth Davies, MP for Grantham and Stamford
Philip Davies, MP for Shipley (previously endorsed Hunt)
David Davis, MP for Haltemprice and Howden (previously endorsed Mordaunt)
Jonathan Djanogly, MP for Huntingdon (previously endorsed Hunt)
Steve Double, MP for St Austell and Newquay (previously endorsed Badenoch and Javid)
Oliver Dowden, MP for Hertsmere
Flick Drummond, MP for Meon Valley
Philip Dunne, MP for Ludlow
Ruth Edwards, MP for Rushcliffe
Michael Ellis, MP for Northampton North
George Eustice, MP for Camborne and Redruth (previously endorsed Shapps)
Luke Evans, MP for Bosworth (previously endorsed Mordaunt)
Laura Farris, MP for Newbury
Simon Fell, MP for Barrow and Furness (previously endorsed Tugendhat)
Liam Fox, MP for North Somerset
Lucy Frazer, MP for South East Cambridgeshire
George Freeman, MP for Mid Norfolk (previously endorsed Mordaunt)
Louie French, MP for Old Bexley and Sidcup
Richard Fuller, MP for North East Bedfordshire
Mark Garnier, MP for Wyre Forest
Nick Gibb, MP for Bognor Regis and Littlehampton
Peter Gibson, MP for Darlington
Jo Gideon, MP for Stoke-on-Trent Central (previously endorsed Tugendhat)
John Glen, MP for Salisbury
Robert Goodwill, MP for Scarborough and Whitby
Michael Gove, MP for Surrey Heath (previously endorsed Badenoch)
Richard Graham, MP for Gloucester
James Gray, MP for North Wiltshire (previously endorsed Mordaunt)
Damian Green, MP for Ashford (previously endorsed Mordaunt and Tugendhat)
Andrew Griffith, MP for Arundel and South Downs (subsequently endorsed Truss)
Robert Halfon, MP for Harlow (previously endorsed Javid)
Luke Hall, MP for Thornbury and Yate
Stephen Hammond, MP for Wimbledon (previously endorsed Tugendhat)
Matt Hancock, MP for West Suffolk
Greg Hands, MP for Chelsea and Fulham
Mark Harper, MP for Forest of Dean
Sally-Ann Hart, MP for Hastings and Rye
Simon Hart, MP for Carmarthen West and South Pembrokeshire
Damian Hinds, MP for East Hampshire
Simon Hoare, MP for North Dorset
Richard Holden, MP for North West Durham
Kevin Hollinrake, MP for Thirsk and Malton
Paul Holmes, MP for Eastleigh (previously endorsed Tugendhat)
John Howell, MP for Henley
Paul Howell, MP for Sedgefield
Nigel Huddleston, MP for Mid Worcestershire
Jeremy Hunt, MP for South West Surrey (previously ran for leadership)
Robert Jenrick, MP for Newark
Andrew Jones, MP for Harrogate and Knaresborough
Fay Jones, MP for Brecon and Radnorshire
Marcus Jones, MP for Nuneaton
Simon Jupp, MP for East Devon
Alicia Kearns, MP for Rutland and Melton (previously endorsed Mordaunt)
Gillian Keegan, MP for Chichester
Greg Knight, MP for East Yorkshire
John Lamont, MP for Berwickshire, Roxburgh and Selkirk (previously endorsed Mordaunt)
Mark Logan, MP for Bolton North East (previously endorsed Tugendhat)
Jonathan Lord, MP for Woking
Alan Mak, MP for Havant
Anthony Mangnall, MP for Totnes (previously endorsed Hunt)
Julie Marson, MP for Hertford and Stortford
Paul Maynard, MP for Blackpool North and Cleveleys
Mark Menzies, MP for Fylde
Huw Merriman, MP for Bexhill and Battle
Andrew Mitchell, MP for Sutton Coldfield (previously endorsed Hunt)
James Morris, MP for Halesowen and Rowley Regis
Andrew Murrison, MP for South West Wiltshire
Bob Neill, MP for Bromley and Chislehurst
Caroline Nokes, MP for Romsey and Southampton North (previously endorsed Mordaunt)
Guy Opperman, MP for Hexham
Mark Pawsey, MP for Rugby (previously endorsed Tugendhat)
Dan Poulter, MP for Central Suffolk and North Ipswich (previously endorsed Hunt)
Rebecca Pow, MP for Taunton Deane
Victoria Prentis, MP for Banbury
Jeremy Quin, MP for Horsham
Will Quince, MP for Colchester
Dominic Raab, MP for Esher and Walton
Tom Randall, MP for Gedling (previously endorsed Badenoch)
Angela Richardson, MP for Guildford
David Rutley, MP for Macclesfield
Selaine Saxby, MP for North Devon
Andrew Selous, MP for South West Bedfordshire
Grant Shapps, MP for Welwyn Hatfield (previously ran for leadership)
David Simmonds, MP for Ruislip, Northwood and Pinner
Chris Skidmore, MP for Kingswood (subsequently endorsed Truss)
Julian Smith, MP for Skipton and Ripon
Mark Spencer, MP for Sherwood
John Stevenson, MP for Carlisle (previously endorsed Tugendhat)
Bob Stewart, MP for Beckenham (previously endorsed Mordaunt)
Gary Streeter, MP for South West Devon
Mel Stride, MP for Central Devon
Julian Sturdy, MP for York Outer
Desmond Swayne, MP for New Forest West (previously endorsed Braverman and Badenoch)
Robert Syms, MP for Poole (previously endorsed Tugendhat)
Maggie Throup, MP for Erewash (previously endorsed Zahawi)
Edward Timpson, MP for Eddisbury
Laura Trott, MP for Sevenoaks
Shailesh Vara, MP for North West Cambridgeshire
Theresa Villiers, MP for Chipping Barnet
Charles Walker, MP for Broxbourne (previously endorsed Mordaunt)
Robin Walker, MP for Worcester (previously endorsed Javid)
Jamie Wallis, MP for Bridgend (previously endorsed Mordaunt)
Matt Warman, MP for Boston and Skegness
Helen Whately, MP for Faversham and Mid Kent 
James Wild, MP for North West Norfolk
Craig Williams, MP for Montgomeryshire
Gavin Williamson, MP for South Staffordshire
Jeremy Wright, MP for Kenilworth and Southam (previously endorsed Javid and Mordaunt)
Mike Wood, MP for Dudley South (previously endorsed Javid)
Jacob Young, MP for Redcar

Liz Truss 

Lucy Allan, MP for Telford (previously endorsed Badenoch)
Lee Anderson, MP for Ashfield (previously endorsed Badenoch)
Stuart Anderson, MP for Wolverhampton South West
Edward Argar, MP for Charnwood (previously endorsed Javid)
Sarah Atherton, MP for Wrexham (previously endorsed Mordaunt)
Gareth Bacon, MP for Orpington (previously endorsed Badenoch)
Shaun Bailey, MP for West Bromwich West 
Duncan Baker, MP for North Norfolk (previously endorsed Mordaunt)
Steve Baker, MP for Wycombe (previously endorsed Braverman)
Aaron Bell, MP for Newcastle-under-Lyme (previously endorsed Tugendhat)
Scott Benton, MP for Blackpool South (previously endorsed Braverman)
Jake Berry, MP for Rossendale and Darwen (previously endorsed Tugendhat)
Saqib Bhatti, MP for Meriden (previously endorsed Javid)
Bob Blackman, MP for Harrow East
Peter Bone, MP for Wellingborough
Karen Bradley, MP for Staffordshire Moorlands (previously endorsed Tugendhat)
Suella Braverman, MP for Fareham (previously ran for leadership)
Paul Bristow, MP for Peterborough (previously endorsed Shapps)
Sara Britcliffe, MP for Hyndburn (previously endorsed Zahawi)
Felicity Buchan, MP for Kensington
Robert Buckland, MP for South Swindon (previously endorsed Sunak)
Alex Burghart, MP for Brentwood and Ongar (previously endorsed Badenoch)
Conor Burns, MP for Bournemouth West
Rob Butler, MP for Aylesbury
Alun Cairns, MP for Vale of Glamorgan (previously endorsed Sunak)
Andy Carter, MP for Warrrington South
Bill Cash, MP for Stone
Christopher Chope, MP for Christchurch
Simon Clarke, MP for Middlesbrough South and East Cleveland
Brendan Clarke-Smith, MP for Bassetlaw
James Cleverly , MP for Braintree
Thérèse Coffey, MP for Suffolk Coastal
Damian Collins, MP for Folkestone and Hythe (previously endorsed Mordaunt)
Alberto Costa, MP for South Leicestershire (previously endorsed Mordaunt)
Virginia Crosbie, MP for Ynys Môn (previously endorsed Javid)
James Daly, MP for Bury North (previously endorsed Tugendhat)
David TC Davies, MP for Monmouth
James Davies, MP for Vale of Clwyd (previously endorsed Mordaunt and Shapps)
Mims Davies, MP for Mid Sussex (previously endorsed Mordaunt)
Dehenna Davison, MP for Bishop Auckland
Sarah Dines, MP for Derbyshire Dales (previously endorsed Badenoch)
Leo Docherty, MP for Aldershot (previously endorsed Badenoch)
Michelle Donelan, MP for Chippenham (previously endorsed Mordaunt and Zahawi)
Nadine Dorries, MP for Mid Bedfordshire
Jackie Doyle-Price, MP for Thurrock
Richard Drax, MP for South Dorset (previously endorsed Braverman)
James Duddridge, MP for Rochford and Southend East
David Duguid, MP for Banff and Buchan
Iain Duncan Smith, MP for Chingford and Woodford Green
Mark Eastwood, MP for Dewsbury
Natalie Elphicke, MP for Dover (previously endorsed Mordaunt)
David Evennett, MP for Bexleyheath and Crayford
Michael Fabricant, MP for Lichfield (previously endorsed Mordaunt)
Anna Firth, MP for Southend West
Katherine Fletcher, MP for South Ribble 
Mark Fletcher, MP for Bolsover (previously endorsed Zahawi)
Nick Fletcher, MP for Don Valley (previously endorsed Badenoch)
Vicky Ford, MP for Chelmsford
Kevin Foster, MP for Torbay
Mark Francois, MP for Rayleigh and Wickford
Mike Freer, MP for Finchley and Golders Green
Marcus Fysh, MP for Yeovil
Nus Ghani, MP for Wealden
Chris Green, MP for Bolton West (previously endorsed Tugendhat)
Andrew Griffith, MP for Arundel and South Downs (previously endorsed Sunak)
James Grundy, MP for Leigh
Jonathan Gullis, MP for Stoke-on-Trent North (previously endorsed Zahawi)
Rebecca Harris, MP for Castle Point
Trudy Harrison, MP for Copeland (previously endorsed Mordaunt and Shapps)
John Hayes, MP for South Holland and the Deepings (previously endorsed Braverman and Badenoch)
Oliver Heald, MP for North East Hertfordshire (previously endorsed Hunt)
James Heappey, MP for Wells
Gordon Henderson, MP for Sittingbourne and Sheppey (previously endorsed Mordaunt)
Darren Henry, MP for Broxtowe
Antony Higginbotham, MP for Burnley (previously endorsed Mordaunt)
Adam Holloway, MP for Gravesham
Tom Hunt, MP for Ipswich (previously endorsed Badenoch)
Sajid Javid, MP for Bromsgrove (previously ran for leadership)
Ranil Jayawardena, MP for North East Hampshire
Mark Jenkinson, MP for Workington (previously endorsed Zahawi)
Andrea Jenkyns, MP for Morley and Outwood
Caroline Johnson, MP for Sleaford and North Hykeham (previously endorsed Badenoch)
Gareth Johnson, MP for Dartford 
David Jones, MP for Clwyd West (previously endorsed Braverman)
Daniel Kawczynski, MP for Shrewsbury and Atcham (previously endorsed Hunt)
Julian Knight, MP for Solihull
Danny Kruger, MP for Devizes (previously endorsed Braverman)
Kwasi Kwarteng, MP for Spelthorne
Pauline Latham, MP for Mid Derbyshire (previously endorsed Badenoch and Javid)
Andrea Leadsom, MP for South Northamptonshire (previously endorsed Mordaunt)
Edward Leigh, MP for Gainsborough
Ian Levy, MP for Blyth Valley (previously endorsed Mordaunt)
Andrew Lewer, MP for Northampton South (previously endorsed Badenoch)
Brandon Lewis, MP for Great Yarmouth (previously endorsed Zahawi)
Julian Lewis, MP for New Forest East (previously endorsed Braverman)
Chris Loder, MP for West Dorset
Marco Longhi, MP for Dudley North (previously endorsed Badenoch)
Julia Lopez, MP for Hornchurch and Upminster (previously endorsed Badenoch)
Craig Mackinlay, MP for South Thanet 
Cherilyn Mackrory, MP for Truro and Falmouth 
Rachel Maclean, MP for Redditch (previously endorsed Badenoch and Javid)
Scott Mann, MP for North Cornwall
Jerome Mayhew, MP for Broadland  (previously endorsed Mordaunt)
Jason McCartney, MP for Colne Valley (previously endorsed Braverman)
Stephen McPartland, MP for Stevenage
Stephen Metcalfe, MP for South Basildon and East Thurrock (previously endorsed Braverman)
Robin Millar, MP for Aberconwy (previously endorsed Braverman)
Maria Miller, MP for Basingstoke (previously endorsed Mordaunt)
Amanda Milling, MP for Cannock Chase (previously endorsed Zahawi)
Nigel Mills, MP for Amber Valley (previously endorsed Badenoch)
Damien Moore, MP for Southport (previously endorsed Tugendhat)
Penny Mordaunt, MP for Portsmouth North (previously ran for leadership)
Anne Marie Morris, MP for Newton Abbot (previously endorsed Tugendhat)
Joy Morrissey, MP for Beaconsfield
Wendy Morton, MP for Aldridge-Brownhills
Kieran Mullan, MP for Crewe and Nantwich (previously endorsed Mordaunt)
David Mundell, MP for Dumfriesshire, Clydesdale and Tweeddale
Sheryll Murray, MP for South East Cornwall (previously endorsed Shapps)
Lia Nici, MP for Great Grimsby
Matthew Offord, MP for Hendon
Mike Penning, MP for Hemel Hempstead (previously endorsed Mordaunt)
John Penrose, MP for Weston-super-Mare (previously endorsed Mordaunt)
Chris Philp, MP for Croydon South (previously endorsed Javid)
Mark Pritchard, MP for The Wrekin (previously endorsed Shapps)
Tom Pursglove, MP for Corby
John Redwood, MP for Wokingham
Jacob Rees-Mogg, MP for North East Somerset
Nicola Richards, MP for West Bromwich East (previously endorsed Mordaunt)
Laurence Robertson, MP for Tewkesbury
Mary Robinson, MP for Cheadle (previously endorsed Javid)
Andrew Rosindell, MP for Romford
Lee Rowley, MP for North East Derbyshire (previously endorsed Badenoch)
Dean Russell, MP for Watford
Paul Scully, MP for Sutton and Cheam
Bob Seely, MP for Isle of Wight (previously endorsed Mordaunt)
Alec Shelbrooke, MP for Elmet and Rothwell
Chris Skidmore, MP for Kingswood (previously endorsed Sunak)
Chloe Smith, MP for Norwich North
Greg Smith, MP for Buckingham (previously endorsed Braverman)
Henry Smith, MP for Crawley (previously endorsed Braverman)
Amanda Solloway, MP for Derby North
Alexander Stafford, MP for Rother Valley
Jane Stevenson, MP for Wolverhampton North East
Graham Stuart, MP for Beverley and Holderness (previously endorsed Shapps)
James Sunderland, MP for Bracknell (previously endorsed Mordaunt)
Derek Thomas, MP for St Ives (previously endorsed Mordaunt)
Craig Tracey, MP for North Warwickshire (previously endorsed Mordaunt)
Anne-Marie Trevelyan, MP for Berwick-upon-Tweed (previously endorsed Tugendhat)
Tom Tugendhat, MP for Tonbridge and Malling (previously ran for leadership)
Ben Wallace, MP for Wyre and Preston North
Giles Watling, MP for Clacton
Suzanne Webb, MP for Stourbridge
Heather Wheeler, MP for South Derbyshire (previously endorsed Mordaunt)
Craig Whittaker, MP for Calder Valley
John Whittingdale, MP for Maldon
Bill Wiggin, MP for North Herefordshire  (previously endorsed Badenoch)
Nadhim Zahawi, MP for Stratford-on-Avon(previously ran for leadership)

Tom Tugendhat 

Nickie Aiken, MP for Cities of London and Westminster (subsequently endorsed Sunak)
Aaron Bell, MP for Newcastle-under-Lyme (subsequently endorsed Truss)
Jake Berry, MP for Rossendale and Darwen (subsequently endorsed Truss)
Karen Bradley, MP for Staffordshire Moorlands (subsequently endorsed Truss)
Rehman Chishti, MP for Gillingham and Rainham (subsequently endorsed Sunak)
James Daly, MP for Bury North (subsequently endorsed Truss)
Simon Fell, MP for Barrow and Furness (subsequently endorsed Sunak)
Jo Gideon, MP for Stoke-on-Trent Central (subsequently endorsed Sunak)
Chris Green, MP for Bolton West (subsequently endorsed Truss)
Damian Green, MP for Ashford (subsequently endorsed Mordaunt, then Sunak)
Stephen Hammond, MP for Wimbledon (subsequently endorsed Sunak)
Paul Holmes, MP for Eastleigh (subsequently endorsed Sunak)
Neil Hudson, MP for Penrith and The Border
Robert Largan, MP for High Peak
Mark Logan, MP for Bolton North East (subsequently endorsed Sunak)
Damien Moore, MP for Southport (subsequently endorsed Truss)
Anne Marie Morris, MP for Newton Abbot (subsequently endorsed Truss)
Mark Pawsey, MP for Rugby (subsequently endorsed Sunak)
Ben Spencer, MP for Runnymede and Weybridge
John Stevenson, MP for Carlisle (subsequently endorsed Sunak)
Robert Syms, MP for Poole (subsequently endorsed Sunak)
Anne-Marie Trevelyan, MP for Berwick-upon-Tweed (subsequently endorsed Truss)

Nadhim Zahawi 

Jack Brereton, MP for Stoke-on-Trent South (subsequently endorsed Mordaunt)
Sara Britcliffe, MP for Hyndburn (subsequently endorsed Truss)
Michelle Donelan, MP for Chippenham (subsequently endorsed Mordaunt, then Truss)
Tobias Ellwood, MP for Bournemouth East (subsequently endorsed Mordaunt; whip suspended on 19 July)
Ben Everitt, MP for Milton Keynes North
Mark Fletcher, MP for Bolsover (subsequently endorsed Truss)
Jonathan Gullis, MP for Stoke-on-Trent North (subsequently endorsed Truss)
Mark Jenkinson, MP for Workington (subsequently endorsed Truss)
David Johnston, MP for Wantage
Brandon Lewis, MP for Great Yarmouth (subsequently endorsed Truss)
Amanda Milling, MP for Cannock Chase (subsequently endorsed Truss)
Jesse Norman, MP for Hereford and South Herefordshire
Paul Scully, MP for Sutton and Cheam
Maggie Throup, MP for Erewash (subsequently endorsed Sunak)

Former MPs 
This list does not include former MPs that became peers

Rishi Sunak 

Paul Goodman, former MP for Wycombe (2001–10) and editor of ConservativeHome
David Lidington, former MP for Aylesbury (1992-2019) and former cabinet minister
David Mellor, former MP for Putney (1979-1997) and former cabinet minister

Penny Mordaunt 

Julian Brazier, former MP for Canterbury (1987-2017)

Liz Truss 
Ann Widdecombe, former MEP for South West England (2019-2020) and former MP for Maidstone and The Weald (1987-2010)

Peers

Kemi Badenoch
The Lord Agnew of Oulton
The Baroness Cavdendish of Little Venice
The Lord Coe
The Baroness Fox of Buckley (non-affiliated)
The Baroness Stowell of Beeston

Liz Truss 
The Lord Ahmad of Wimbledon
The Lord Frost of Allenton
The Lord Harris of Peckham
The Viscount Ridley

Penny Mordaunt
The Baroness Foster of Oxton

Rishi Sunak
The Lord Howard of Lympne
The Baroness Davidson of Lundin Links
The Lord Hague of Richmond
The Lord Lawson of Blaby
The Lord Lilley

Members of devolved legislatures

Rishi Sunak 
 Jeremy Balfour, MSP for Lothian
 Miles Briggs, MSP for Lothian 
 Donald Cameron, MSP for Highlands and Islands 
 Jackson Carlaw, MSP for Eastwood 
 James Evans, MS for Brecon and Radnorshire (subsequently endorsed Truss)
 Maurice Golden, MSP for North East Scotland
 Sam Kurtz, MS for Carmarthen West and South Pembrokeshire
 Dean Lockhart, MSP for Mid Scotland and Fife
 Liz Smith, MSP for Mid Scotland and Fife
 Alexander Stewart, MSP for Mid Scotland and Fife

Liz Truss 
 Finlay Carson, MSP for Galloway and West Dumfries
 Sharon Dowey, MSP for South Scotland
 James Evans, MS for Brecon and Radnorshire (previously endorsed Sunak)
 Murdo Fraser, MSP for Mid Scotland and Fife
 Rachael Hamilton, MSP for Ettrick, Roxburgh and Berwickshire
 Liam Kerr, MSP for North East Scotland
 Stephen Kerr, MSP for Central Scotland (previously endorsed Tugendhat)
 Douglas Lumsden, MSP for North East Scotland
 Oliver Mundell, MSP for Dumfriesshire
 Graham Simpson, MSP for Central Scotland

Tom Tugendhat
Stephen Kerr, MSP for Central Scotland (subsequently endorsed Truss)

Directly elected mayors

Jeremy Hunt
Andy Street, Mayor of the West Midlands  (subsequently endorsed Truss)

Rishi Sunak 
Ben Houchen, Mayor of Tees Valley

Liz Truss 

 Andy Street, Mayor of West Midlands (previously endorsed Hunt)

Individuals

Kemi Badenoch
Glynis Barber, actress
Julie Bindel, feminist campaigner and journalist
Allison Bailey, barrister, lesbian feminist and anti-racist activist 
Sharron Davies, former Olympic swimmer
Nigel Farage, broadcaster and former UKIP leader (previously endorsed Braverman)
Matthew Goodwin, professor of politics at University of Kent, author and political commentator 
Leo McKinstry, journalist, historian and author
Fraser Nelson, journalist and editor of The Spectator (subsequently endorsed Sunak)
Patrick O'Flynn, journalist and former UKIP MEP for East of England (subsequently endorsed Truss)
Calvin Robinson, political commentator, teacher and church deacon
Aris Roussinos, journalist and writer for UnHerd
David Starkey, historian and presenter
Andrew Sullivan, writer and journalist
Damian Thompson, journalist
Robert Tombs, historian, professor and author

Suella Braverman
Nigel Farage, broadcaster and former UKIP leader (subsequently endorsed Badenoch)

Sajid Javid
Benedict Rogers, human rights activist and journalist

Penny Mordaunt
Gerard Lyons, economist
Allison Pearson, columnist and author
Lesia Vasylenko, Ukrainian politician
Vasyl Virastyuk, Ukrainian politician

Rishi Sunak
James Forsyth, journalist
Fraser Nelson, journalist and Editor of The Spectator
Adar Poonawalla, Indian businessman
Emily Sheffield, journalist

Liz Truss 
Arlene Foster, former first minister of Northern Ireland
Patrick O'Flynn, journalist and former UKIP MEP for East of England (previously endorsed Badenoch)
Daphne Trimble, former NIHRC and ECNI member and widow of David Trimble

Tom Tugendhat 
Bret Stephens, American journalist

Publications

References 

2022 Conservative Party (UK) leadership elections
Liz Truss
Political endorsements in the United Kingdom
Rishi Sunak